In molecular biology, OST4 (Dolichyl-diphosphooligosaccharide—protein glycosyltransferase subunit 4) is a subunit of the oligosaccharyltransferase complex.
OST4 is a very short, approximately 30 amino acids, protein found from fungi to vertebrates. It appears to be an integral membrane protein that mediates the en bloc transfer of a pre-assembled high-mannose oligosaccharide onto asparagine residues of nascent polypeptides as they enter the lumen of the rough endoplasmic reticulum.

References

Protein families
Chi, J.H., Roos, J. and N. Dean. (1996) The OST4 gene of Saccharomyces cerevisiae  encodes an unusually small protein required for normal levels of oligosaccharyltransferase activity J. Biol. Chem. 271;3132-3140.